Thita is a genus of longhorn beetles of the subfamily Lamiinae, containing the following species:

 Thita glauca Aurivillius, 1914
 Thita philippinensis Breuning, 1973

References

Pteropliini